David R. White is an American artistic director and executive producer. He served as the executive director of the Dance Theater Workshop from 1975 to 2003 and is The Yard's artistic director and executive producer.

Roles 
1988–present: Chair, Atlantic Center for the Arts
2011–2014: Manager, Public Imaginations
2007–2011: Director, ARTVENTURES
1975–2003: Executive director and producer, Dance Theater Workshop (aka New York Live Arts)
1975: Co-founder, Pentacle

Awards and honors 
1987: Dance Magazine Award
1995: "Distinguished Alumnus" of Wesleyan University
Knight in France's Order of Arts and Letters
2000: Recipient of the Dance/USA Honors
2000: Capezio Dance Award
Governor of NY State Award
Mayor of NY State Award

References

Living people
American male dancers
American theatre directors
Year of birth missing (living people)